United Nations Security Council Resolution 322, adopted unanimously on November 22, 1972, after reaffirming previous resolutions and considering the Organisation of African Unity's recognition of the revolutionary movements of Angola, Guinea-Bissau, Cape Verde and Mozambique, the Council called on the government of Portugal to cease its military operations and all acts of repression against the people of those territories.  The Resolution called on Portugal to enter negotiations with the parties concerned with a view to achieving a solution to the armed confrontations and permitting the peoples of those territories to exercise their right to self-determination and requested the Secretary-General to follow developments and report periodically to the Council.

See also
List of United Nations Security Council Resolutions 301 to 400 (1971–1976)
Portuguese Colonial War
Portuguese Empire

References 
Text of the Resolution at undocs.org

External links
 

 0322
20th century in Portugal
 0322
 0322
 0322
 0322
 0322
Portuguese Angola
Portuguese Mozambique
Portuguese Colonial War
Portuguese Guinea
Portuguese Cape Verde
November 1972 events